Yuzhny is a rural locality (a settlement) in Bolshesosnovskoye Rural Settlement, Bolshesosnovsky District, Perm Krai, Russia. The population was 136 as of 2010. There are 2 streets.

Geography 
Yuzhny is located 8 km east of Bolshaya Sosnova (the district's administrative centre) by road. Bolshaya Sosnova is the nearest rural locality.

References 

Rural localities in Bolshesosnovsky District